Yangpyeong County (Yangpyeong-gun) is a county in Gyeonggi Province, South Korea.

Climate
Yangpyeong has a monsoon-influenced humid continental climate (Köppen: Dwa) with cold, dry winters and hot, rainy summers.

Korean War

Yangpyeong includes the village of Jipyeong, which was a Korean War battle site.

Sister cities
 Gangbuk-gu, Seoul, South Korea
 Songpa-gu, Seoul, South Korea

Culture

Natural Monument
Yongmunsa Ginkgo (Natural Monument No. 30)

Movie
Introduction of Architecture (2012)

Region festival
Clear Water Love Festival (Every May–June)
World Outdoor Performance Festival (Every August)
Yangpyeong Ginkgo Festival (Every October)
Yangpyeong Lee Bong-ju Marathon (Every June)
Han River Riders Gran Fondo (Every Fall)

Attraction
Dumulmeori : dumulmeori that a pure Korean  of  yangsuri formed one by meeting South Han River and the North Han River is a favorite place for lovers
Semiwon
South Han River Bike Trail

Notable people
Lee Soo-geun —  is a South Korean comedian
Choung Byoung-gug — is a South Korean politician, Member of Parliament.(Yeoju-Yangpyeong)
JooE - Member of Momoland (Originally from Seoul, South Korea)
Kim Keon-hee - is a South Korean businesswoman and the current First lady of South Korea

See also
 Geography of South Korea

References

External links

County government website (in Korean)

 
Counties of Gyeonggi Province